María Carmen de Icaza y de León, 8th Baroness of Claret (17 May 1899 – 16 March 1979) was a Spanish journalist and novelist from 1935–60. She enjoyed success with her 1936 novel, Cristina Guzmán, which was subsequently adapted for the stage, television and cinema. By 1945, she was a best-selling writer in Spain. Her father was Mexican writer and diplomat Francisco A. de Icaza.

Biography
María Carmen de Icaza y de León was born on 17 May 1899 in Madrid, the second daughter of Francisco Asís de Icaza y Beña, a Mexican ambassador and poet, and his wife, Beatriz de León y Loynaz, born in La Habana, daughter of Spanish aristocrats. She had four sisters: Beatriz, Ana María, María Luz and María Sonsoles (Marquesa de Llanzol), and one brother, Francisco de Asís.

One 1925, her father died, and she began working at El Sol newspaper. In 1930, she married Lt. Col. Pedro Montojo Sureda, and in 1932 they had her only daughter Paloma Montojo y de Icaza, mother of Íñigo Méndez de Vigo.

She started to writing novels in 1935 as Valeria de León, later she used her real name Carmen de Icaza. On 14 December 1951, she obtained her noble title of 8th Baroness of Claret, by her collaboration with charity.

Her husband died on 17 March in 1978, and she died on 16 March 1979 in her native Madrid.

Bibliography

As Valeria de León
 La boda del Duque Kurt (1935) (reedited as Talía in 1951)

As Carmen de Icaza
 Cristina Guzmán (1936)
 ¡Quién sabe...! (1939)
 Soñar la vida (1941)
 Vestida de tul (1942)
 El tiempo vuelve (1945)
 La fuente enterrada (1947)
 Yo, la Reina (1950)
 Las horas contadas (1953)
 La casa de enfrente (1960)

References

External links

1899 births
1979 deaths
Spanish novelists
Writers from Madrid
Spanish romantic fiction writers
Women romantic fiction writers
20th-century Spanish novelists
20th-century women writers